The National Mutual Insurance Federation of Agricultural Cooperatives (Japanese: 全国共済農業協同組合連合会), commonly known as "JA Kyosai" (ＪＡ共済) or ZENKYOREN, is Japan's national mutual aid association of agricultural cooperatives, founded based on Japan's Agricultural Cooperative Law. ZENKYOREN was founded in 1951 and provides property, liability and life insurance.

References

External links 

Agriculture in Japan
Cooperative federations
Financial services companies established in 1951
1951 establishments in Japan
Cooperatives in Japan